Maurício Alberto Kaisermann (born 7 September 1951), better known by his stage name Morris Albert, is a Brazilian singer and songwriter best known for his 1974 single "Feelings".

Biography
Albert was born into an Austrian immigrant family. At the beginning of his musical career, he was a member of several bands as a singer and guitarist After the success of the first single "Feel the Sunshine", he recorded his debut album in 1974 under the title Feelings, which reached No. 1 in his homeland and stayed on the charts for half a year. The single "Feelings" was a soft rock hit song and made Albert a one-hit wonder. The ballad reached the top ten U.S. Billboard charts in the summer of 1975 and sold more than 1 million copies, and was awarded a gold disc by the RIAA on 13 November 1975. Feelings made Albert sell more than 160 million records (including singles, albums and compilations) worldwide. Also in 1975 Albert successfully recorded the single “Leave me” in the United States. He won 43 gold and 17 platinum albums.
In 1978 in the United States, he recorded another hit, "She's My Girl", among several other of his compositions.

Albert has four sons from three relationships
and currently lives in Italy with his family.

"Feelings" controversy
"Feelings" was based on a melody composed by French songwriter Loulou Gasté. Albert originally claimed the melody as his own, but was later successfully sued by Gasté in 1988, for stealing of intellectual property. Morris was defended by William Sheffield in Gaste's lawsuit. Gasté received approximately 1/2 million dollars US for the plagiarism lawsuit over his melody in the 1957 French movie soundtrack of "Le feu aux poudres".

Discography

Albums
1974 - After We've Left Each Other''
 1975 - En Castellano! 
 1976 - Morris Albert
1977 - Love and Life
1978 - Ubaldo Continiello, Morris Albert - Feeling Love (L'ultimo Sapore Dell'aria) 
1979 - Once Upon a Man
1981 - Solitude
1983 - Beginnings
1984 - Feelings
 1984 - Very Alive - Again
 1987 - Back To Love 
 1990 - Feelings
1996 - Sentimientos
1999 - Lover
2003 - Moods
2004 - Cuore
 2006 - Live & Forever
 2011 - Feelings Of Love

Sources:

Singles and EPs

1972 - Feel the Sunshine/Good Morning Mr.Sun
1973 - The Throat
1973 - Shalom My Israel/The Man from Nazareth
1973 - The Throat (Single)
1974 - Feelings
 1974 - Sentimientos
 1974 - Sentimientos / Gitana
 1974 - Woman / Where Is The Love Of The World
1974 - Feelings" – US #6; US AC #2; UK #4, SA #5, AU #5, NZ #4,
1975 - Leave Me
1975: "Sweet Loving Man" – U.S. No. 93, Easy Listening #15; Canada #83, AC #17
 1975 - Dime/Cristina
 1975 - Sweet Loving Man / Christine
 1975 - Signor Censore/Feelings
1976 - She's My Girl
1976 - Memories
 1976 - Primer Lugar Del Festival De Mallorca 1976. Seras = So Nice / Por Ultima Vez = If Only She'd Say...
 1976 - Ella Es Mi Chica / Todos Aman A Alguien
 1976 - Woman / Where Is The Love Of The World
 1976 - Leave Me/Vieni
1977 - So Nice
1977 - Conversation
1977: "Someone, Somehow"
1977 - Conversation
 1977 - Midnight/Part Of Me
 1977 - Conversation/Mornings
 1977 -  Morris Albert
 1978 - フィーリングラブ = Feeling Love
 1979 - Angel Lady/Once Upon A Man
 1981 - Manila Nights 

1982 - Do You Miss Me
 1983 - Feelings
 1983 - I Look At The Sun
 1983 - Feelings/Natural High
 1983 - Dahil Sa Iyo/Because Of You
2003 - Empty View
2004 - Cuore (with Mietta)
 Unknown - Feelings/Forever
 Unknown - If We Believe
Unknown - Lisa Martine, Morris Albert, Linda Hargrove, Larry Fox – Lisa Martine

Compilations

 1979 - Feelings
 1991 - Seleção De Ouro
 1993 - L'Album D'Or
 1993 - Feelings
 1998 - Feelings
 2004 - Feelings

Sources:

See also
List of one-hit wonders on the UK Singles Chart
List of one-hit wonders in the United States
List of performers on Top of the Pops
I Love the '70s (U.S. TV series)

References

External links

 Morris Albert - Discogs

1951 births
Living people
Brazilian songwriters
20th-century Brazilian male singers
20th-century Brazilian singers
Brazilian people of Austrian descent
English-language singers from Brazil
Singers from São Paulo
Soft rock musicians